Tanauan (IPA: [tɐn'ʔaʊɐn]), officially the Municipality of Tanauan, is a 2nd class municipality in the province of Leyte, Philippines. According to the 2020 census, it has a population of 57,455 people.

Tanauan is one of the oldest towns in Leyte dating back to the year of 1710. It is composed of 54 barangays. The town was also known as the “Cradle of the Intellectuals” or the Bungto han Kamag-araman since the Spanish colonial era. Tanauan is approximately 18 kilometers south of Tacloban City which is the capital of the Eastern Visayas Region. It is bounded on the north by the municipality of Palo, Tolosa on the south, Dagami and Tabon-tabon on the west side and on the east by San Pedro Bay. The town was also heavily damaged by the Super Typhoon Haiyan (Yolanda) in November 2013. The town celebrates its fiesta annually on August 15.

History

Pre-Spanish to Spanish Colonial Era
The town got its name from a towering Molave tree which served as a look-out tower. “Tan-awan” or "taran-awan" means to look-out in Waray language. A person who serves as a look-out watches for the Moro Pirates who'd like to plunder and loot the settlements along the coast.

The first known settlers of Tanauan were the family of Calanao with his wife and only daughter. In 1661, Juanillo Siengco's family joined the Calanao family in the settlement along the riverbanks of the Bukid River at the foot of Adil Hill. By the time their settlements were more developed, the plundering of the Moros along the coast intensified. Seeking for refuge, they built a stone-walled enclosure called cuta in the area of Buaya. Later on, Juanillo's son, Josef, married Calanao's daughter, Sangod, and from the families of Juanillo Siengco and Calanao a tribe was formed which gave Tanauan its first tribal leaders.

In 1710, the first town officials were appointed by the Spanish authorities during the Spanish reign in the Philippines. From 1710 up to the end of the Spanish Colonial era in 1900's and the start of American occupation, 47 persons became chief executives of the municipality.

Tolosa, an adjacent town to the south of Tanauan, was once part of the municipality. Through the efforts of Magdalino Vivero and Domingo Camacho, they petitioned the Spanish government to grant Tolosa autonomy from the municipality. The petition was granted in 1852.

American Colonial Period to Japanese Occupation/ World War II
During the American regime on 1901 to 1943, a new set of municipal executives were assigned. When World War II broke out, Pedro A. Villegas was the incumbent mayor.

When the Japanese occupied the town, the incumbent Mayor Pedro Villegas and his secretary Janario Perez refused to serve the Japanese authorities. Thus, Rufo Cobacha was appointed mayor by the Japanese and followed by Pedro Bulik who was eventually killed by the local guerillas.

During the Japanese occupation, the town was burned by the guerillas in 1943. This unfortunate event destroyed the municipal building, including its records, and a lot of the big ancestral houses of Spanish architectures along Calle Real. When the US Allied Forces stormed the town during the liberation of Leyte, it resulted in further destruction of the municipal hall (Lian Chong Building) and the few remaining houses along Calle Real. However, few lives were lost during the assault as the town's people were warned beforehand and took refuge at the fortified parish church. Eugenio Avila Sr. was the incumbent mayor when the Filipino and American Liberation Forces occupied the town. The US Sixth Army initially established its headquarters in Tanauan before the construction of the airfield began in November 1944.

Tanauan Airfield and its logistical importance during the liberation of the Philippines
The X and XXIV Corps from the United States Sixth Army took part in the liberation of Tanauan from the Japanese Occupation Forces immediately after the US and Allied Forces landed at the coastal waters of Leyte in October 1944. Shortly thereafter, the United States Sixth Army, under the command of Lieutenant General Walter Krueger, established its headquarters in Tanauan. On November 15, 1944, a meeting was held at the site of the Sixth Army headquarters by the commanders and staff members of the major units who participated in the Luzon Campaign.

When the US and Allied Forces had able to capture the Tacloban airstrip, the work to further develop it for US warplanes had been handicapped due to the heavy concentration of troops, supplies, and equipment in the area during the early stages of the operation. It was further hampered by insufficient supply of corals for surfacing the runway. Works were also simultaneously done on the other two airstrips of Buri and San Pablo in the vicinity of Burauen, but it was halted in the latter part of November 1944. A considerable amount of time and effort have been expended in futile attempts to make these airfields usable. The inability of the Sixth Army to meet its construction dates on the airstrips prevented the US forces from stopping the flow of Japanese reinforcements and made it impossible for the Allied Forces to give sufficient land-based air support to the ground troops.

In a desperate move to have an operational airfield, Lieutenant General Walter Krueger received permission from General Douglas MacArthur to construct an airfield in Tanauan. On November 28, 1944, the headquarters of the US Sixth Army was moved to Tolosa to start the construction of the airfield. The airfield site covers an area bounded on the north, south and west by Embarcadero River, and on the east by San Pedro Bay. The site was favorably chosen due to its generally flat terrain, good sandy surface, and satisfactory drainage - which proved to be an excellent location for an airfield. In December 1944, the field became operational. By December 25, 1944, there have been completed one runway with mat surfacing, one overrun, 90,000 square feet of warm-up area, 120,000 square feet of alert apron, one parallel taxiway, and 26 large dispersal areas. The control tower was code named “Velvet Tower.”

All Marine Aircraft Group 12 (MAG-12) planes in Leyte, which played an important air support role for the Sixth Army, moved from Tacloban Airfield to Tanauan Airfield in December 1944. The airfield was used by the following units:

 312th Bombardment Group (November 19, 1944 to February 10, 1945)
 340th Fighter Squadron (December 15, 1944)
 341st Fighter Squadron (December 14, 1944)
 460th Fighter-Interceptor Training Squadron (December 12, 1944)
 433rd Troop Carrier Group (January 19, 1945 to May 31, 1945)
 348th FG 460th Fighter Squadron (P-47)
 348th FG 340th Fighter Squadron (P-47)
 348th FG 341st Fighter Squadron (P-47)
 348th FG 342nd Fighter Squadron (P-47)
 25th Liaison Squadron (UC-78 and L-5).
The airfield was abandoned following the withdrawal of the Allied Forces after the war and was later on referred to as "landing" by the locals. Today, a small remnant of this airfield can still be found in the area called "Pawa" located in Barangay Santo Niño. Most of the remaining areas are now occupied by large business establishments such as the Pepsi Cola Tanauan Plant and New Leyte Edible Oil Manufacturing Corporation. The Tanauan Public Market, various commercial buildings and residential neighborhoods can also be found in the area. The airfield covers the area of what is now known as Barangay San Roque and Barangay Santo Niño. Maharlika Highway (formerly known as Highway 1), which connects Eastern Visayas Region with Luzon to the north and Mindanao to the south, traverses through the former airfield site.

Post World War II to the present day
During the liberation, Benito Saavedra was appointed mayor of the newly restored Philippine government, then succeeded by the following in the order of incumbencies:
 Rufo Cumpio -1945
 Dioniso Boco - 1946
 Pelagio O. Tecson – 1946-1947
After the liberation period, Dionisio Boco became the first mayor, then succeeded by Pelagio O. Tecson Sr. In 1950, Barrio Haclagan, the site of the former US Airfield, was renamed Santo Niño.

Pelagio Tecson, Sr. was the mayor during the Martial Law in the Philippines up to February 25, 1986, EDSA Revolution when Felix Cortez was appointed OIC Mayor by the new government. The local elections held on February 1, 1988, resulted in the election of Charles R. Avila. It was during his tenure that he was appointed as Administrator of the Philippine Coconut Authority in January 1991, and Vice Mayor Rodolfo Cinco succeeded him as a mayor.

In May 1992 synchronized elections for national and local officials, Atty. Roque Tiu won over five candidates for the mayoralty position. Tiu was the chief executive of the town until his second term ended in 1998. Mark Gimenez was elected mayor from 1998 to 2001. During the 2001 elections, Atty. Roque Tiu ran again and won over Mark Gimenez. Roque Tiu became the mayor for three consecutive terms from 2001 to 2010. After Tiu completed his term, his vice mayor Agapito Pagayanan Jr. run for the mayoralty position during the 2010 national elections and won. His term started from 2010 and ended in 2013. During the 2013 mid-term elections, Pelagio Tecson, Jr. won over the incumbent mayor with just a small margin of votes.

Geography

Barangays
Tanauan is politically subdivided into 54 barangays, namely:

Climate

Demographics

Language
Waray-waray is the language spoken by the people of Tanauan. It is the lingua franca or common language of the Eastern Visayas region. However, Tagalog is the language that is widely understood and spoken by the locals when talking to other people coming from Manila and other provinces. English remains the language used by the local government and schools on official correspondences and documents. Waray-waray is used as a medium of instruction in schools in the municipality from Kinder to Grade 3. Filipino and English languages are officially taught in schools as part of the primary and secondary education curriculum requirement.

Religion

Tanauan has a 100% Christian population. Almost 96-97% of the municipality's population are Roman Catholic Christians. Every village has its own Roman Catholic chapel aside from the parish church in the town proper. There are also adherents of other Christian denominations and sects like the Iglesia ni Cristo, The Church of Jesus Christ of Latter-Day Saints (Mormons), Seventh-day Adventists (Sabadistas), Evangelicals (Born Again Christians), Jehovah's Witnesses (Mga Saksi ni Jehova) and many more.

The municipality's patron saint is the Our Lady of Assumption or Nuestra Señora de Asunción.

Economy

In 2005, the municipality registered a total income of PHP 47.6 million and went up to PHP 56.4 million in 2007, representing an average annual increase of over 9%, mostly coming from considerable increases in local taxes, permits & licenses and the Internal Revenue Allotment. The outstanding economic performance was attributed largely to the reforms and initiatives that were introduced by Mayor Roque Tiu, which streamlined the processes of getting business and license permits.

As a result of these reforms, the municipality of Tanauan earned the Award of "2006 Most Business-Friendly Municipality in the Country" during the closing rites of the 32nd Philippine Business Conference held at the Manila Hotel on October 20, 2006. then President Gloria Arroyo handed over the award to Mayor Roque Tiu and his wife PIA-8 Director Olive Tiu. Prior to winning this award, the municipality of Tanauan was adjudged as the Most Business-Friendly Municipality in the Visayas Area.

The businesses and industries that support the local economy are from agriculture, livestock, fishing, forestry & mining, trade and industry, and tourism.

The major investors in the municipality of Tanauan are the following:
 Pepsi Cola (Tanauan Plant)
 Wella Metal Corporation
 New Leyte Edible Oil Manufacturing Corporation

Local Industries and Crafts
Tanauan is known for various locally made crafts which include bamboo craft, mat-weaving, bolos, brooms, hats, bricks, pottery, nipa shingles, and virgin coconut oil - most of which are made of local and indigenous materials. These trades have been the source of local pride, like the talented bricks and pottery makers of Barangay Canramos. Tanauan is also one of the best source of clays in the region. These trades are mainly promoted by the federation of Tanauan Women's Club with the support of the local government of Tanauan.

Infrastructure

Storm drainage system
Tanauan still lacks an efficient infrastructure for its storm drainage system. Although storm drainage projects were constructed in the past, it was poorly planned and maintained that resulted in a failure to prevent occasional flooding in various places within the town proper due to sedimentation and clogging of existing drainage canals.

Healthcare facilities
 Tanauan Birthing Facility
The construction of the birthing facility of Tanauan in 2009 was made possible thru the efforts of Mayor Roque Tiu and the assistance of the Japanese Government. The project was funded through the Embassy of Japan's Grant Assistance for Grassroots Human Security Projects (GGP) with a grant of US$62,135 (approximately 3 million pesos). The facility was turned over to the local government of Tanauan on April 27, 2010. The Embassy of Japan's Minister for Economic Affairs Tomochika Uyama was present during the ceremony. The facility became operational since May 2010, and provides appropriate and accessible medical services for pregnant women in Tanauan.

Utilities and Telecommunications
The following are the telephone, mobile phone, and electric companies serving the area of Tanauan.

Telephone Companies:
 Bayan Telecommunications, Inc.
 Eastern Visayas Telephone Company

Mobile Phone Service Provider:
 Globe Telecom
 Smart Communications
 DITO

Electric Companies:
 Leyte Electric Cooperative I (LEYECO I)
 Don Orestes Romualdez Electric Cooperative (DORELCO)

Water Supply:
 Leyte Metropolitan Water District (LMWD)
 Prime Water (PW)

Parks and playgrounds
Tanauan currently has one large municipal plaza which is located right at the heart of the town across the back of the old municipal hall. It has a mini-amphitheater and a large outdoor grounds which is often used as a venue for large open air activities such as the annual Pasaka Festival Competition and other various outdoor gatherings of the town, It also has two outdoor basketball court and one outdoor tennis courts. Surrounding the plaza are various centuries-old acacia trees that is one of the well-preserved in the Region.

Transportation
Tanauan is accessible mainly by land using Public Utility Jeepney as the primary means of public transportation. Taxis are also available from Tacloban City and the Regional Airport but generally costs higher compared to the much cheaper Jeepneys. On the other hand, pedicabs and motor cabs are available when travelling within the local vicinity of Tanauan.

Education

Primary School/Elementary School
Tanauan I Central School (Public)
Tanauan II Central School (Public)

Secondary School/High School
 Assumption Academy (Private)
 Kiling National High School (Public)
 Tanauan School of Craftsmanship and Home Industries (Public)
 Tanauan National High School (Public)
 Tanauan School of Arts and Trade (Public)

College/University
 Eastern Visayas State University - Tanauan Campus (Public)

Heritage and Culture

Local Customs and Etiquettes
Most locals take off their slippers, shoes, or flip flops before entering a house. During weddings, it is customary for the bride and groom to do the traditional folk dance called Kuratsa and members of the families and guests alike are encouraged to pin money on their attire as a symbol of good luck and prosperity for the couple's future. Tanauan-anons also observe fiesta celebrations annually in different barangays to honor their respective local catholic saints. During the fiesta, it is a tradition to prepare food in every house and invite guests and visitors to share their meal as a sign of thanksgiving.

Church of Our Lady of the Assumption
The church is one of the six architectural heritage sites in Leyte. It was originally built by the Jesuit Missionaries in 1704 and was turned over to the Augustinians in the year 1768. Father Francisco de Paula Marquez spearheaded the repair and enlargement of the church from 1850 to 1860. He added a transept and constructed thick rock walls at the perimeter of the church with towers on each four corners for defense against pirates. The Church survived a hurricane and storm surge of 1897. The Church takes pride of its stations of the cross made of Spanish terracotta originally made in Mexico. The rectory and pulpit were restored.

Pasaka Festival
Pasaka Festival started in 1991. The word "pasaka" means "assumption" which refers to the Virgin Mary as she was assumed into heaven. The festival, which runs from August 1 through 15, is seen as an opportunity to showcase the rich cultural heritage of Tanauan. It is a means of paying homage and thanksgiving to the town’s patroness, Our Lady of the Assumption. It begins with a nightly cultural presentation being held from August 1 through 14 at the Tanauan Public Plaza, which showcases the best talents, culture, and tradition of the municipality participated in by various schools, the local government unit, and the non-government organizations of Tanauan.

In the afternoon of August 14, the traditional Pasaka Festival competition is held which features a colorful presentation of dance drama and street-dancing that depicts a community paying homage to the blessed virgin as she is assumed into heaven. The competition is grouped into three categories: the Senior category participated in by high school students and the Junior category composed of elementary pupils and the merry makers. The festival culminates on August 15, the Feast of the town's patroness, Our Lady of the Assumption, and a Holy Mass is celebrated at the Our Lady of the Assumption Parish Church. It is also observed as Tanauan Day which is a local holiday.

Tinikling and its possible origins in Tanauan
Tinikling is the most popular and best known of Philippine dances and honored as the Philippine national dance. It is one of the oldest Philippine traditional dances and originated in Leyte province. The people of Leyte describe the tikling bird as one of the most unique in its movements - walking around and between the tree branches and some grass stems. This bird was named "tikling" from which the tinikling dance got its name. Because of the creativeness of the Leyteños, they imitate this bird by using bamboo poles.

In 2006, the attention of the then Mayor Roque Tiu was called regarding the 2005 calendar of the Philippine National Oil Corporation entitled sulyap (glimpse) which highlighted the looking back into the home of Filipino culture and taking a glimpse into one's roots in relation to moving forward in life. In the second page (March–April page), it featured the Tinikling with a brief description in Filipino: ...”ang Tinikling ay nagmula sa Tanauan, Leyte. Isa ito sa mga pinaka-kilalang Pilipinong sayaw sa buong mundo. Ang pagkamalikhain ng mga taga Leyte ay nagbigay buhay sa simpleng galaw ng ibong tikling, kung saan nakuhaang pangalan ng sayaw. Sa Tinikling naipamalas ang likas na halina at pagiging masayahin na nabubukod-tangi sa mga Pilipino.” Since then, the municipal government of Tanauan requested historians and enthusiasts of culture and the arts to shed light on the issue so that the local government can initiate moves towards preserving the culture of the municipality, which has been entitled as the “Cradle of Intellectuals” or "Bungto Han Kamag-araman" ever since the Spanish era. Another version of the story has it that the Tinikling really originated in Tanauan, Leyte, particularly in Barangay Kiling. The name “Kiling” is also derived from the tikling bird. This version of the story has yet to be authenticated. Today, pinpointing the exact origin of this dance still remains a mystery.

Vicente I. De Veyra, a native of Leyte, collected folk songs such as "Tinikling" in his book Mga Ambahan.

Skimboarding
Tanauan is recognized as the “Skimboarding Capital of the Philippines". It is told by tradition that skimboarding was first introduced in Tanauan in 2001, when an Palau national came to Tanauan to win the heart of a local lass. Since Tanauan is situated along the coast facing San Pedro Bay, the Palau national started making a skimboard which he eventually finished. However, he was not able to teach the local youths on how to use it since he needed to leave and go back to Palau. He left the skimboard, and the local youths started to train themselves on how to use it. Thereafter, young people from Barangay San Roque and Barangay Santo Niño started making prototypes of the skimboard which were then sold to enthusiasts. However, According to the locals. In the year December 1999, skimboarding was already been seen on tanauan shore before the Palau National came to Tanauan Leyte. And they called it "sulinap" using a plastic floater from a scrap of jetski, without knowing that the game they are playing is called skimboarding. The first ride happened at "Air Waves" now called as Sabang Surf Camp Dulag Leyte. Darwin De Veyra Maceda was the first rider of "sulinap". And he showed it to his brother Beben De Veyra Maceda, until they both embrace the game and teach the locals in Tanauan Leyte.

It has also been told, however, that the first skimboarder in the Philippines, Michael Miranda, together with his friend Kim Ian "Dodot" Montaño made the first locally-made skimboard, and with their enthusiasm for the sports introduced the skimboard and taught Tanauan locals how to ride it. The first skimboarding competition was organized by Darwin Maceda together with his friends Alexander Cumpio and Nerizza Reynera at Tanauan, Leyte's Bantay Dagat area on March 31, 2002. Since then, skimboarding started to spread to the nearby towns and later on throughout the country. Currently, national and international skimboarding competitions are held annually at the Bantay Dagat area in Tanauan.

References

External links

 [ Philippine Standard Geographic Code]
Philippine Census Information
Local Governance Performance Management System
 

Municipalities of Leyte (province)